The 2018–19 ISU Speed Skating World Cup, officially the ISU World Cup Speed Skating 2018–2019, was a series of six international speed skating competitions that ran from November 2018 through March 2019.

Calendar
The detailed schedule for the season.

Note: the men's 5000 and 10000 metres were contested as one cup, and the women's 3000 and 5000 metres were contested as one cup, as indicated by the color coding.

Men's standings

500 m

1000 m

1500 m

Long distance

Mass start

Team pursuit

Team sprint

Women's standings

500 m

1000 m

1500 m

Long distance

Mass start

Team pursuit

Team sprint

References

External links
 ISU World Cup Speed Skating website

 
18-19
Isu Speed Skating World Cup, 2017-18
Isu Speed Skating World Cup, 2018-19